The Tour of Poyang Lake is a multi-day road cycling race held annually in China. It is contested in September near Lake Poyang, in the Jiangxi province. Created in 2010, it generally attracts a large number of riders from UCI Continental teams, although it is not included on the UCI calendar.

Winners

References

External links
 

Cycle races in China
Recurring sporting events established in 2010
2010 establishments in China